Deepstaria reticulum, is a jellyfish of the family Ulmaridae. It was described by Larson, Madin, and Harbison in 1988. This was the second described Deepstaria species, the first having been Deepstaria enigmatica (Russell, 1967).

Description
Deepstaria reticulum has a wide, fan-like bell that is often a deep purple color, under the bell there is a small cluster of tentacles, loaded with stinging, venomous barbs like any other jellyfish. At the largest, they get about 0.7 meters long. Unlike D. enigmatica, the bell of D. reticulum is spread wide, like a thin, translucent bed sheet.

Further reading

External links 
Deepstaria reticulum entry in the Smithsonian Invertebrate Zoology Collections
Deepstaria reticulum entry in the World Register of Marine Species

Ulmaridae
Animals described in 1988